The Westamaran is a pioneer type of passenger transport high speed catamarans developed by Westermoen Hydrofoil in 1973. The craft was highly successful, and introduced a new era of passenger transport along the Norwegian coast and elsewhere. 

On the Bergen to Stavanger route, there was already a high speed service by hydrofoil, introduced early in the 1960s. The initial Westamaran models were somewhat slower than the hydrofoils, but passenger comfort, both in terms of spaciousness but especially foul weather handling, was better in the Westamarans, so they were better liked by the public. 

The Westamaran had asymmetrical hulls, where the insides was essentially flat, forming a tunnel between the hulls that were rectangular in shape. The profiles were in fact quite like a Storm class torpedo boat cut in two, and the construction of the Westamaran built heavily on the experience gained from the Storm class.

Specifications:
 Capacity: 166 passengers
 Length overall: 26.67m
 Beam:	9.02m
 Draft: 1.20m
 Engines: 2 x Diesel MTU 12 V 396 TC 62
 Power: 2 x 880 kW. 
 Layout: Shaft drive through two ZF BW 800 HS 20 hydraulic gearboxes to LIPS fixed propellers. 
 Aux. engine: Mercedes OM314, Stamford MHC 2341 generator 32,5 kVA

External links
 Westamaran, image from http://www.hydrofoilen.no/
 Article from Classic Fast Ferries

Ship types
Catamarans